The Gávea Group comprises two investment management firms (Gávea Investimentos and Gávea Equity) and one distributor (Gávea DTVM). These are regulated by the Central Bank of Brazil, the Comissão de Valores Mobiliários - CVM (Brazil’s equivalent to the US SEC) and the Brazilian Financial and Capital Markets Association (ANBIMA).

Assets under management of approximately US$3.5 billion as of March 2019.

Gávea was founded in the 2nd quarter of 2003 by Arminio Fraga and Luiz Henrique Fraga, launching its first two products in August of that same year. Its activities are focused on four lines of business; hedge funds, private equity funds, equity funds and real estate funds.

Gávea has offices in Rio de Janeiro and São Paulo, with a staff of approximately 150.

In November 2010, Gávea announced the sale of a majority interest in its capital to J.P. Morgan Asset Management, the asset management arm of JPMorgan Chase. And consequently, creating a strategic alliance with Highbridge Capital Management, the global alternative asset manager owned by J.P. Morgan Asset Management. Its investment process for each of the existing lines of business remains unchanged, under the leadership of CIO Arminio Fraga, Luiz Henrique Fraga and their teams.

References

External links
Gávea Investimentos
Back In The Civilian Saddle: Arminio Fraga from Britain's Financial Times
Fund tracker at Bloomberg

Financial services companies of Brazil
Hedge funds
Companies based in Rio de Janeiro (city)
Financial services companies established in 2003
2003 establishments in Brazil